Robert A. Seiple (born December 6, 1942) is an American non-profit executive, and former military officer, university administrator, and diplomat.  He served as the athletic director at Brown University from 1975 to 1979.  He was president of Eastern College—now known as Eastern University— in St. Davids, Pennsylvania and Eastern Baptist Theological Seminary—now known as Palmer Theological Seminary— in King of Prussia, Pennsylvania from 1983 to 1987.  In December 1986 he was named president of World Vision International, serving from 1987 to 1998. Seiple served as the first United States Ambassador-at-Large for International Religious Freedom from 1999 to 2001. He was succeeded by John Hanford.

Early life
Seiple joined the United States Marine Corps as an officer. He flew combat missions as a pilot in Vietnam during the Vietnam War.

References

1942 births
Living people
Heads of universities and colleges in the United States
Brown Bears athletic directors
Brown University alumni
Recipients of the Distinguished Flying Cross (United States)
United States Marine Corps officers
United States Ambassadors-at-Large
People from Warren County, New Jersey
United States Naval Aviators
Military personnel from New Jersey